Brockway Area Junior and Senior High School are the only intermediate and secondary schools in the Brockway Area School District. The junior and senior high school facilities are located in Brockway, Jefferson County, Pennsylvania, United States. According to the National Center for Education Statistics, in 2010, the school reported an enrollment of 490 pupils in grades 7th through 12th. The school employed 40 teachers yielding a student teacher ratio of 12:1.

Extracurriculars
The district offers a variety of clubs, activities and sports.

High school athletics 
Brockway Area participates in PIAA District IX.

References

External links
Brockway Area Senior High School

Public high schools in Pennsylvania
Public middle schools in Pennsylvania
Schools in Jefferson County, Pennsylvania